A deep-fried Mars bar (also known as a battered Mars Bar) is a Mars-brand chocolate bar covered in batter then deep fried in oil. The dish originated at a chip shop in Scotland as a novelty item. Since various mass media began reporting on the practice in the mid-1990s – often as a critical commentary on how unhealthy the Scottish diet was – the popularity of the dish has spread.

Preparation 
The dish is prepared using standard commercial Mars bars. The chocolate bar is typically chilled before battering, to prevent it from excessively melting as it is fried. It is coated in flour batter of the type commonly used for deep-frying fish, sausages, and other similar foods, then immersed in boiling fat or oil, until the batter is cooked.

Origin

The origins of the deep-fried Mars bar are disputed. John Davie claimed to have invented it in 1992 in The Haven Chip Bar (now The Carron) in Stonehaven, near Aberdeen on Scotland's northeast coast. It received rapidly escalating media attention after Aberdeen Evening Express writer Alastair Dalton reported on 23 August 1995, "HOT chocolate has become this summer’s sizzler in Stonehaven chip shop. Mars Bars, deep-fried in batter, are being snapped up by sweet-toothed teenagers. The craze started when the school holidays began and has quickly taken hold says Ingram Mowatt (41), owner of The Haven, Allardice Terrace. " The article included a quote from Mars spokesperson who said this was the most unusual way they had come across of enjoying a Mars bar. The following day the story was picked up and run in the Daily Record in an article titled "Mars supper, please". Scottish broadsheets The Herald and The Scotsman ran the story the following day and the UK broadsheets the day after, each adding their own cultural slant. On the fifth day, Keith Chegwin performed taste tests on The Big Breakfast TV programme and the story was covered by the BBC World Service.

Other chip shops have disputed the Carron's claim. Tom Cummings, former owner of Duncan Street Chip Shop in Banff, stated he had sold fried Mars bars in the 1980s, and that he had copied the recipe from the since defunct Dodie’s Chip Shop in Buckie.

Popularity

After the food was mentioned in 2004 by Jay Leno on NBC's Tonight Show in the United States, The Lancet commissioned the University of Dundee to validate the association between Scotland and the deep-fried Mars bar. It undertook a telephone questionnaire survey of 627 fish and chip shops in Scotland, 62% of which responded, and found:
66 shops (22% of those responding) sold them; three-quarters of those had only been selling them for the past 3 years.
An additional 17% had sold them in the past.
Average sales were 23 bars per week, although 10 shops reported selling 50—200 per week.
The mean price was £0.60 (range £0.30 to £1.50).
76% were sold to children.
15 shops reported health concerns with the food.
Many of the shops which did not sell the product refused to do so as it turns the frying oil black.

In 2012, the originating Carron Fish Bar estimated sales of 100150 deep-fried Mars bars per week, but that 70% were sold to visitors who have heard of its reputation.

Culinary influence

In 2000, Scottish chef Ross Kendall included the bars on the menu of Le Chipper restaurant in Paris.

The deep-fried Mars bar has also given rise to the frying of other confections, for example, Reiver's Fish Bar in Duns annually advertises an Easter special of deep-fried Creme Egg. Deep-fried Snickers have also been reported; it is popular at state fairs and similar events. In her 1999 book and television series Nigella Bites, Nigella Lawson includes a recipe for a deep-fried Bounty bar. Deep-fried Moro bars are also sold in New Zealand, where the brand is popular.

Symbol of an unhealthy diet
Since the Daily Record described it as "Scotland's craziest takeaway", the deep-fried Mars bar has become a symbol for ill health, obesity and high-fat diets. The original article was quickly followed up by other UK publications, with the food portrayed to speak eloquently about Scotland's and the wider UK's poor diet, and resultant levels of obesity.

In 2012, the Haven sought an application for protected geographical indication under the EU's Protected Food Name Scheme. But Mars wrote to the fish bar asking it to make plain that deep-frying of the bars was "not authorised or endorsed" by Mars, and an agreed disclaimer statement was put up in both the shop and in its menu.

In a 2012 interview, Glasgow restaurateur John Quigley felt that Scotland had been trying to "shake off" its unhealthy image for 20 years, since the media coverage of the deep-fried Mars bar.

See also
 Deep-fried Twinkie
 Deep-fried pizza
 Fried ice cream
 Baked Alaska
 List of deep-fried foods

References

External links

 CBS News
 Deep-Fried Candy Bars: Scotland's Worst Food? National Geographic News, Dec 28, 2004

Mars bar
Scottish desserts
Scottish confectionery
Food and drink introduced in 1995